Ust-Ishimsky District is an administrative and municipal district (raion), one of the thirty-two in Omsk Oblast, Russia. It is located in the northwest of the oblast.

Population: 13,480 (2010 Census);  The population of Ust-Ishim accounts for 35.6% of the district's total population.

The Ust'-Ishim man, an ancient skeleton dated to 45,000 years before present, was discovered on the bank of the Irtysh River in Ust-Ishimsky District.

Notable residents 

Vilis Krištopans (born 1954), Latvian politician, Prime Minister of Latvia 1998–1999

References

Notes

Sources

Districts of Omsk Oblast